Paul Rideout (born 14 August 1964) is an English former professional footballer and youth team coach of Major League Soccer side Sporting Kansas City.

As a player, he was a striker from 1980 until 2002, notably in the Premier League with Everton where he scored the winning goal in the 1995 FA Cup final against Manchester United at Wembley Stadium. He also played in his native land for Swindon Town, Aston Villa, Southampton, Notts County and Tranmere Rovers. During his career he also spent time in Italy, Scotland, China and the United States with Bari, Rangers, Qianwei Huandao, Chongqing Huandao, Shenzhen Jianlibao and Kansas City Wizards. He was capped 6 times by England U21, scoring one goal. He later moved into coaching and worked back with the Kansas City Wizards across their youth academy.

Club career

Swindon Town
Rideout's career began as a 15-year-old at Swindon Town as their youngest ever first team player, and he finished the 1980–81 season with four goals from 16 Third Division games. He established himself as a first team player in 1981–82 by playing 35 games and scoring 14 goals, though it was not enough to save Swindon from relegation to the Fourth Division he initially decided to remain at the County Ground to help them win promotion. After they failed to win promotion in 1982–83, despite Rideout's 20 goals in 44 games, he was transferred to First Division club Aston Villa for £200,000 by manager Tony Barton.

Aston Villa
He scored five goals in 25 league games during his first season as a First Division player at Villa Park, and also helped them reach the Football League Cup semi finals, though they could only manage a 10th-place finish in the league. He remained a first team player the following season under new manager Graham Turner, scoring 14 goals in 29 games though Villa finished mid table once again.

Bari & Southampton
Then came a transfer to Italian team Bari, where Rideout spent three years before returning to England in a £430,000 move to Southampton on 5 July 1988.

Rideout was initially a regular first team player at The Dell, but the arrival of Iain Dowie in March 1991 cost him his place in the side after 71 league games and 19 goals, and he then dropped down a division with a nine-game loan spell at Swindon Town, where he scored once, before returning to Southampton for the 1991–92 season.

Notts County
He made four more appearances for The Saints, failing to score a goal, before he was sold to Notts County for £250,000 on 16 September 1991, just after they began their first top division season since 1984. However, they were already struggling to avoid relegation from the First Division and manager Neil Warnock saw Rideout as the man to help County preserve their top flight status and gain a place in the new FA Premier League which would begin the following season. However, he lasted barely four months at Meadow Lane, scoring three goals in 11 league games (his performances failed to improve County's league form and they ended the season relegated).

Rangers
He joined Rangers for £500,000 on 10 January 1992. He scored once in 11 games, providing adequate backup for the strike partnership of Mark Hateley and Ally McCoist, as Rangers won the double of the Scottish Premier Division and SFA Cup, and played one game in the 1992–93 Scottish league season.

Everton
He returned to England in a £500,000 move to Everton on 14 August 1992 – the day before their first game in the new Premier League. Among his fellow strikers was Mo Johnston – the player whose gap he had effectively filled at Rangers just months earlier.

Rideout's first season at Goodison Park was something of a disappointment, as he managed just three goals in 24 games and was unable to break up the strike partnership of Peter Beardsley and Tony Cottee, and it was a similar story the following season (despite Beardsley's departure to Newcastle United) as he managed just 24 league appearances once again, though he did improve his goals tally to six for the 1993–94 season. It was not a good time for Everton, either, as their Premier League debut had brought them a 13th-place finish, and after going top of the Premier League by winning their first three games of the 1993–94 season, their form slumped dramatically (failing to improve after Mike Walker succeeded Howard Kendall as manager in mid season) and they only narrowly avoided relegation.

The 1994–95 season was arguably the finest of Rideout's career. He scored 14 goals from 29 Premier League games as Everton overcame a 12-match winless league start to finish in a secure 15th place following Walker's dismissal in favour of Joe Royle, and scored the only goal of the FA Cup final as Everton won their first major trophy since 1987 and condemned Manchester United to their first trophyless season since 1989.	
With Beardsley, Cottee and Johnston now gone, Rideout now had an effective strike partner in the shape of Duncan Ferguson and a capable deputy in Daniel Amokachi.

The 1994–95 campaign was as good as it got for Rideout in his time at Everton, though he did score six goals in 25 league games to help them finish sixth in 1995–96. The following season saw him restricted to a mere 10 league appearances, during which he failed to score, and at the end of the campaign he left the club.

Later career
He transferred to Qianwei Huandao in China, where he was voted 'Best Overseas player' in the Chinese League. He then moved to the United States of America in 1998 to play for the Kansas City Wizards from 1998–1999 before returning to the Chinese league until 2000, playing for Shenzhen Jianlibao.

Rideout's last club was Tranmere Rovers, where he played until May 2002, before being appointed to the club's coaching staff as an assistant with Tranmere Rovers Youth Academy. His time at Tranmere Rovers is most memorable for the FA Cup match against former club Southampton, in which he scored three of four second half goals to win the game after his team had been 3–0 down at half-time, Stuart Barlow scoring the other. However, on the league scene it was not a successful time for player and club. They were relegated in bottom place at the end of his first season after a decade of second tier football, which had seen manager John Aldridge forced out of his job after five years at the helm. Rideout's former Everton teammate Dave Watson was then appointed manager at Prenton Park, but was unable to restore Tranmere to Division One in Rideout's final season before retiring as a player.

International career
Although he did not represent the England national football team at full-level, he played several times for England at schoolboy, under-18 and under-21 level. At international level he scored over thirty goals, including a hat-trick for England schoolboys in a match lost 5-4 to Scotland at Wembley Stadium.

Coaching career
Following his spell coaching at the club's academy, Rideout then returned to the United States and began coaching with the Kansas City Wizards, managing all three of the club's youth squads. Rideout also coaches a U17 girl's teams and a U16 boys team.

Career statistics

Honours
Everton
FA Cup: 1994–95
FA Charity Shield: 1995

Individual
PFA Team of the Year: 1982–83 Fourth Division
Swindon Town Player of the Season: 1982–83

References

External links

Biography at Kansas City Wizards

1964 births
Living people
Footballers from Bournemouth
English footballers
England under-21 international footballers
Everton F.C. players
Aston Villa F.C. players
Southampton F.C. players
Tranmere Rovers F.C. players
Sporting Kansas City players
Premier League players
Major League Soccer players
Serie A players
Serie B players
Scottish Football League players
Rangers F.C. players
Swindon Town F.C. players
S.S.C. Bari players
Chongqing Liangjiang Athletic F.C. players
English expatriate footballers
British expatriates in China
Expatriate footballers in China
Shenzhen F.C. players
English expatriate sportspeople in Italy
Expatriate footballers in Italy
Expatriate soccer players in the United States
Sporting Kansas City non-playing staff
Notts County F.C. players
Association football forwards
English expatriate sportspeople in the United States
FA Cup Final players